École Provencher is the oldest school in Saint Boniface, Winnipeg, Manitoba. 

rom its earliest beginnings in 1818 under the guidance of Father Provencher, the school has occupied various sites in St. Boniface. In 1906, École Provencher found its current and permanent home at the corner of rue St. Jean Baptiste and avenue de la Cathédrale.

Originally part of the St. Boniface School Division, École Provencher is now within the Louis Riel School Division.  Students from Kindergarten to grade 3 are schooled in the French Immersion program, continuing the tradition set by the founders of receiving instruction in both official languages.  The school also houses independent day-care facilities and nursery school programs.

Notable alumni
Earl Dawson – politician and president of the Manitoba and Canadian Amateur Hockey Associations

References

Educational institutions established in 1818
Elementary schools in Winnipeg
1818 establishments in Canada

Saint Boniface, Winnipeg